Thysanoprymna superba is a moth of the family Erebidae. It was described by William Schaus in 1889. It is found in Mexico, Costa Rica and Venezuela.

References

Phaegopterina
Moths described in 1889